Lophiodes is a genus of goosefishes. It is one of four extant genera in the family Lophiidae.

Species
There are currently 18 recognized species in this genus:
 Lophiodes beroe J. H. Caruso, 1981
 Lophiodes bruchius J. H. Caruso, 1981
 Lophiodes caulinaris Garman, 1899 (Spottedtail angler)
 Lophiodes endoi H. C. Ho & K. T. Shao, 2008 
 Lophiodes fimbriatus Saruwatari & Mochizuki, 1985
 Lophiodes gracilimanus Alcock, 1899
 Lophiodes insidiator Regan, 1921 (Natal angler)
 Lophiodes iwamotoi H. C. Ho, Séret & K. T. Shao, 2011 (Long-spine angler) 
 Lophiodes kempi Norman, 1935 (Longspine African angler)
 Lophiodes lugubris Alcock, 1894
 Lophiodes maculatus H. C. Ho, Séret & K. T. Shao, 2011 (Spotted angler) 
 Lophiodes miacanthus C. H. Gilbert, 1905
 Lophiodes monodi Y. Le Danois, 1971
 Lophiodes mutilus Alcock, 1894 (Smooth angler)
 Lophiodes naresi Günther, 1880 (Goosefish)
 Lophiodes reticulatus J. H. Caruso & Suttkus, 1979 (Reticulated goosefish)
 Lophiodes spilurus Garman, 1899 (Threadfin angler)
 Lophiodes triradiatus Lloyd, 1909 (Shortspine goosefish) 

The FishBase does not recognize Lophiodes lugubris.

References

Lophiidae
Marine fish genera
Taxa named by George Brown Goode
Taxa named by Tarleton Hoffman Bean